Mala Vas may refer to several places in Slovenia:
Mala Vas, Dobrepolje, a settlement in the Municipality of Dobrepolje
Mala Vas, Gorišnica, a settlement in the Municipality of Gorišnica
Mala Vas (Ljubljana), a former settlement in the City Municipality of Ljubljana
Mala Vas pri Grosupljem, a settlement in the Municipality of Grosupljem
Mala Vas pri Ormožu, a settlement in the Municipality of Sveti Tomaž